Histeria may refer to:

Histeria!, animated TV series
Histeria (wrestler) (born 1969)
"Histeria" (song), a 2015 song by Lali Espósito

See also
Hysteria (disambiguation)